"Little Things" is a song written by Michael Dulaney and Steven Dale Jones, and recorded by American country music artist Tanya Tucker.  It was released in February 1997 as the first single from the album Complicated.  The song reached number 9 on the Billboard Hot Country Singles & Tracks chart, becoming her last Top 10 hit.

Music video
The music video was directed by Gerry Wenner and premiered in early 1997.

Chart performance
"Little Things" debuted at number 64 on the U.S. Billboard Hot Country Singles & Tracks for the week of March 1, 1997.

Year-end charts

References

1997 singles
1997 songs
Tanya Tucker songs
Capitol Records Nashville singles
Songs written by Michael Dulaney
Songs written by Steven Dale Jones